The Nevers is an American science fiction drama television series created by Joss Whedon for HBO. The series is produced by HBO and Mutant Enemy Productions with executive producers including Whedon, Philippa Goslett, Doug Petrie, Jane Espenson, Ilene S. Landress, and Bernadette Caulfield. The series premiered on April 11, 2021. The first season consists of 12 episodes, split into two six-episode parts. In December 2022, the series was canceled before the back six had aired and pulled from the HBO Max library on December 18, 2022. All 12 episodes began streaming on Tubi starting February 13, 2023.

The series is set in Victorian London and follows a group of people, mostly women, known as the Touched, who suddenly manifest abnormal abilities. Among them are Amalia True, a mysterious and quick-fisted widow, and her best friend Penance Adair, a brilliant inventor. The series received a straight-to-series order from HBO in June 2018, after a bidding war with other networks and streaming services including Netflix. Laura Donnelly was the first actress to join the series in April 2019, with the rest of the cast joining in July 2019.

Premise
The Nevers is described as "an epic science fiction drama about a gang of Victorian[s] who find themselves with unusual abilities (due to alien intervention), relentless enemies, and a mission that might change the world."

Cast

Main
 Laura Donnelly as Zephyr Alexis Navine / Amalia True: One of The Touched, with the ability to see glimpses of the future. The most irresponsible, spontaneous, and psychologically broken hero of 19th-century London, and a danger to the British elite. She is dedicated to her cause and never turns down a drink.
 Claudia Black portrays Zephyr in a previous body in the episode "True".
 Ann Skelly as Penance Adair: Amalia's best friend, and a Touched with the power of 'seeing' electrical energy patterns and a skill for inventing. She is both religious and heretically progressive.
 Olivia Williams as Lavinia Bidlow: A rich supporter of the Touched, and patron of the Orphanage where many of the main characters live.
 James Norton as Hugo Swann: An aristocratic pansexual young man, who owns a private club and specializes in extortion.
 Tom Riley as Augustus "Augie" Bidlow: A kind gentleman bird watcher, Lavinia's brother and secretly one of the Touched.
 Pip Torrens as Lord Gilbert Massen: A former military man and strong supporter of the British Empire, and very skeptical regarding people with extraordinary powers.
 Denis O'Hare as Dr. Edmund Hague: A brutal American surgeon who is experimenting on the Touched.
 Rochelle Neil as Annie Carbey, aka Bonfire Annie: A criminal with the ability to generate balls of flame.
 Amy Manson as Maladie / Sarah: An unstable member of The Touched living underground. Originally known as Sarah, Maladie is not only in charge of a band of renegades, but is on a killing spree. Maladie also disguises herself as Effie Boyle, a deceased journalist. Manson is credited with the pseudonym Margaret Tuttle when Effie appears.
 Zackary Momoh as Doctor Horatio Cousens: A West Indian physician. Amalia was there when he discovered his own power to heal. He collaborates with her, and the Beggar King.
 Eleanor Tomlinson as Mary Brighton: A failed singer who has a big surprise ahead of her.
 Nick Frost as Declan Orrun, aka The Beggar King: Charismatic and brutal, Declan is in command of London's low-level criminals. Sometimes he works with Amalia and her cause – and sometimes he is just as happy to sell them out.
 Elizabeth Berrington as Lucy Best: A former thief from an extremely poor upbringing who can shatter whatever she touches.
 Viola Prettejohn as Myrtle Haplisch: An omniglot who can understand any spoken language although her own words come out in randomly shifting languages that she cannot control.
 Anna Devlin as Primrose Chattoway: A sixteen-year-old girl who is ten feet tall.
 Kiran Sonia Sawar as Harriet Kaur: A Scottish Sikh who lives at the orphanage; her breath turns things into glass. She dreams of being a lawyer.
 Ben Chaplin as Inspector Frank Mundi: A large and gruff policeman with a strong sense of morals. He has a reputation for violence and heavy drinking.
 Ella Smith as Desirée Blodgett: A prostitute who causes others around her to pour out secrets when they are feeling strong emotions.
 Vinnie Heaven as Nimble Jack: A young thief and member of the Touched who is notorious for breaking and entering and is capable of creating floating disks that can be used as shields or as stepping stones for accessing high places.

Recurring
 Martyn Ford as Nicholas Parbel “Odium”: A henchman of the Beggar King and a Touched whose body repels water.
 Mark Benton as The Colonel: a follower of Maladie and a Touched with a power of persuasion. 
 David Garrick as Winemar Kroos: a follower of Maladie and a Touched who generates bullets from his right arm.
 Rupert Vansittart as Lord Broughton: a member of Massen's Council.
 Andrew Havill as Douglas Broome: a member of Massen's Council.
 Timothy Bentinck as General Pecking: a member of Massen's Council.
 Nicholas Farrell as Prince Albrecht: a member of Massen's Council.
 Tim Steed as Lord Allaven Tyne: a member of Massen's Council.
 Domenique Fragale as Elisabetta "Beth" Cassini: an Italian immigrant and Touched whose turn allows her to make objects levitate. 
 Zain Hussain as Aneel: a member of the Touched and a friend of Harriet.

Episodes

Production

Development 
On July 13, 2018, it was announced that HBO had given the production a straight-to-series order. Joss Whedon would serve as a writer, director, executive producer and showrunner for the series. The series landed at HBO after a bidding war with other networks and streaming services including Netflix. Whedon explained the title at Comic-Con 2018:

Cast and crew 
In April 2019, Laura Donnelly was cast in the starring role of Amalia True. Whedon spoke about her, "Laura Donnelly has charisma, wisdom and an anarchic precision that not only captures Amalia but defines her. She's fierce and she's funny – and I need both for the journey ahead." In July 2019, twelve actors were added to the cast, including Ann Skelly as Penance Adair, Olivia Williams as Lavinia Bidlow, James Norton as Hugo Swann, Tom Riley as Augustus "Augie" Bidlow, Pip Torrens as Lord Massen, Denis O'Hare as Dr. Edmund Hague, Rochelle Neil as Annie Carbey, Amy Manson as Maladie, Zackary Momoh as Doctor Horatio Cousens, Eleanor Tomlinson as Mary Brighton, Nick Frost as Declan Orrun, and Ben Chaplin as Inspector Frank Mundi. One month later, Elizabeth Berrington, Viola Prettejohn, Anna Devlin, Kiran Sonia Sawar, and Ella Smith were all cast in main roles Lucy Best, Myrtle Haplisch, Primrose Chattaway, Harriet Kaur, and Desirée Blodgett. Also in August, Martyn Ford was cast in their recurring role of Nicolas Perbal, also known as Odium.

In the fifth episode, the character Effie Boyle is introduced. Effie is revealed to be one of Maladie's victims, with the Effie seen in the episode being Maladie herself in disguise. In order to create the illusion of Maladie posing as Effie, Amy Manson used makeup, wore a fat suit and then the look was altered in post-production using Computer-generated imagery. In an attempt to fool the audience, a fake name "Margaret Tuttle" was added to IMDb as the actress playing Effie. Executive producers include Bernadette Caulfield, Jane Espenson, and Doug Petrie. Espenson and Petrie, who worked with Whedon on Buffy the Vampire Slayer, will serve as writers. Laurie Penny is also part of the series' writing staff. Gemma Jackson serves as production designer. Academy Award winner Christine Blundell served as the hair and makeup designer. She said that inspiration came from modern-day punk in order to help with the visual world of the series. In June 2021, HBO announced that Andrew Bernstein had joined the series as an executive producer and director.

Filming
On July 4, 2019, Whedon announced that principal photography had started, with filming occurring in London. In July 2019, it was reported that scenes had been filmed at Trinity Church Square, and in the New Wimbledon Theatre area. In August 2019, scenes were filmed at Chatham Historic Dockyard in Kent. In late January 2020, shooting took place at Joyce Grove, an Oxfordshire country house estate in the Jacobean style. The building will double as The Orphanage. Due to the lack of available studio space in London, HBO worked with Adrian Wootton, CEO of Film London and the British Film Commission, to find warehouse spaces and old industrial spaces in which they could base the production.

The series completed production on the first five of its ten-episode order before production was shut down due to the COVID-19 pandemic. Filming resumed in September and production was completed by the end of October. In February 2021, Bloys confirmed that the first season would consist of 10 episodes that would be broken into two airing blocks, due to the production shutdown caused by the COVID-19 pandemic. The season's episode count was then extended to 12 episodes.

Production on the final six episodes of the first season began in June 2021 in the UK with filming completed by December 2021.

Writing 
Speaking to the break in the release schedule between episodes six and seven due to production issues, HBO and HBO Max chief content officer Casey Bloys stated, "And there was kind of a natural narrative break at six. So that was the thought then was to air six episodes. So at least we had something to put out there for subscribers and fans." Bloys also said that Goslett and her team of writers are working through the second batch of scripts now and "we'll get a better sense of timing" when those will air as "the weeks go on." In March 2021, it was clarified that the first season was extended from 10 to 12 episodes, with the second part of the first season also consisting of 6 episodes. Vanessa Armstrong of Syfy.com wrote that star Laura Donnelly thought the script for the series' sixth episode was "so bonkers" that she "initially thought that they got sent the wrong script."

Whedon's departure
On November 25, 2020, Whedon announced that he was stepping down from the series citing various reasons for his decision in "this year of unprecedented challenges." In a released statement he explained that the taxing nature of working on such a project during the coronavirus pandemic had taken a toll on his energy levels, and confirmed rumors that he would be officially exiting the series. On January 28, 2021, British screenwriter Philippa Goslett was announced as the new showrunner. In response to the accusations of workplace harassment against Whedon on his prior projects, Bloys stated that "we had no complaints or no reports of inappropriate behavior" regarding his work on The Nevers. Nevertheless, Whedon's involvement was not acknowledged in the marketing of the series, although he was still properly credited for his work. Afterwards, series regular Denis O'Hare, who portrays Doctor Edmund Hague, noted that he was unaware of the misconduct allegations aimed at Whedon at the time and said that the whole cast was worried about the continued filming of the first season. O'Hare did praise Goslett, calling the new showrunner "the exact right choice" and "I think there's some writing staff that's remaining the same. Whenever they're changing a writer, let alone a showrunner, you don't know what's going to happen to your character."

Cancellation 
On December 12, 2022, HBO canceled the series after one season and it would be pulled from the HBO Max library. It was also reported that the series, including the remaining six unaired episodes, may stream on another platform. Deadline reported that the storyline was "crafted in a way that it concludes with Season 1B". In January 2023, it was confirmed that all 12 episodes would be available on Warner Bros. Discovery's FAST channel on Tubi beginning that year, later specified to be February 13 for episodes 1–5, February 14 for episodes 6–9, and February 15 for episodes 10–12.

Broadcast 
The Nevers premiered on April 11, 2021, on HBO and HBO Max, and was set to consist of 12 episodes, split into two 6-episode parts. The series' official trailer was released on March 23, 2021. The second part of the first season premiered on February 14–15, 2023, on Tubi.

Home media 
The first season, part one, was released on October 5, 2021, on Blu-ray and DVD.

Reception

Critical response
On Rotten Tomatoes, the series has an approval rating of 48% based on reviews from 69 critics, with an average rating of 5.7/10. The website's critics consensus reads, "Despite strong performances and stellar production design, The Nevers struggles to stitch its slew of intriguing components into a solid show." On Metacritic, the series has a score of 57 out of 100 based on 28 reviews, indicating "mixed or average reviews". Ed Cumming of The Independent gave the series three stars out of five, calling it "overstuffed junk shop of ideas" and disliked too many "themes of alienation and acceptance unfold amid horse-drawn chases, expensive special effects, high-society orgies, corset brawls, and wainscoting aplenty." BBC Online's Scott Bryan called it "just a bit too weighted down." Wenlei Ma of News.com.au said The Nevers is "a distillation of Whedon's best and worst filmmaking impulses. It needs someone with a more disciplined eye to cut half of its many dangling threads and subplots."

In a positive review by Lorraine Ali from the Los Angeles Times, she wrote, "The Nevers is a joy to watch and a thrill to follow. Supernatural realism, complex storytelling, fantastical powers and topical realties meet in this smart, suspenseful and colorful production. A litany of nuanced characters keeps this otherworldly tale grounded. Suspenseful sleuthing and action-packed battles move the story along at a rapid clip. And all the lush scenery and ambitious wardrobe along the way". Daniel Fienberg of The Hollywood Reporter gave it a more mixed review, writing that the series is "in desperate need of focus, and as episodes progress, more and more characters are added and the connection to the richest thematic throughline becomes increasingly tenuous". However, Fienberg praised Whedon's directing, as well as the production design and costumes.

Ben Travers of IndieWire criticized the series, saying "The Nevers inconsistencies can make for a maddening viewing experience — sending you from the edge of your seat to sprawled out on the floor, trying to find your eyes after they rolled out of your head — and far too many parts make zero sense whatsoever." However, Travers went on to say that he would continue watching it, and that even though Joss Whedon left the show during production, he had left his mark on it. A three-star review on The Guardian called the series a "mess, within and without" and compared it to Enola Holmes and Penny Dreadful. Darren Franich of Entertainment thought "True" made the series much more interesting, saying "the sixth episode of The Nevers is the troubled HBO drama's best hour yet", but also noted that this development in the plot may have come too late.

On the transition to Tubi, the new livestreaming format was criticized. Leah Marilla Thomas of The Mary Sue called it "a bad way of distributing television" as appointment viewing is not normally "in the middle of the work day in the middle of the work/school week". Adi Tantimedh of Bleeding Cool stated that outlets are not covering "the unseen episodes" as "no one is actually seeing them" given the afternoon timeslot for viewing – "the next opportunity to watch them is in March… and once again, only live". Tasha Robinson, for Polygon, commented that the "limitation on finally seeing the back half of The Nevers has led to fans of the show trying to find workarounds [...]. It also means even the biggest fans are likely to watch the episodes asynchronously over time, at least until they can reliably pirate them. It's just the latest depressing blow for a series that deserved better, and never really had a chance to thrive".

Ratings

Accolades

References

External links
 
 

2020s American drama television series
2020s American science fiction television series
2021 American television series debuts
2023 American television series endings
Costume drama television series
English-language television shows
HBO original programming
Serial drama television series
Television productions suspended due to the COVID-19 pandemic
Television series by Home Box Office
Television series created by Joss Whedon
Television series set in the 19th century
Television series by Warner Bros. Television Studios
Television shows set in London
Television shows shot in London
Tubi original programming
Steampunk television series
Television shows filmed at Pinewood Studios